High Tension may refer to:

 High voltage, or high tension

Film and television
 High Tension, a 2003 French slasher film
 High Tension (1936 film), an American comedy drama
 This Can't Happen Here, also released as High Tension, a 1950 Swedish film 
 High Tension (TV series), an Indian reality show

Music
 High Tension (band), an Australian band
 "High Tension" (song), by AKB48, 2016

See also 

 High Voltage (disambiguation)
 HT (disambiguation)
 Hypertension, high blood pressure
 Overhead power line, a structure used in electric power transmission